The Hamelin ctenotus or Hamelin Pool ctenotus (Ctenotus zastictus) is a species of skink in the family Scincidae.
It is found only in Western Australia.

References

Reptiles of Western Australia
Vulnerable fauna of Australia
Reptiles described in 1984
Taxonomy articles created by Polbot
Skinks of Australia
Ctenotus
Taxa named by Glen Milton Storr